Kenneth Bjerre Jensen (born 24 May 1984 in Esbjerg, Denmark) is a Danish international motorcycle speedway rider.

Career
Bjerre began his Polish league career in 2001 for Ostrów. The following season he began his career in Britain when he joined the Newcastle Diamonds for the 2002 Premier League speedway season. Over the following decade he would become a heat leader for both Belle Vue Aces (2004 to 2006) and Peterborough Panthers (2007 to 2010).

In September 2008, during the Speedway Grand Prix Qualification he won the GP Challenge, which ensured that he claimed a permanent slot for the 2009 Grand Prix. 

During the 2009 Grand Prix series he finished in 8th place, which meant that he retained a permanent rider for the 2010 Grand Prix. His consistency resulted in a 7th place finish in both the 2010 Speedway Grand Prix and 2011 Speedway Grand Prix but he dropped out of the Grand Prix after a disappointing 2012 campaign.

He raced in the United Kingdom for Peterborough Panthers and King's Lynn Stars in the Elite League.

In 2017, he raced for the Belle Vue and averaged 8.95. The following year he appeared for Leicester Lions before going back to Belle Vue for the 2019 season, in which he became the champion of Denmark after winning the 2019 Danish Individual Speedway Championship.

Personal life
His brother, Lasse Bjerre, is also a speedway rider.

Major results

World individual Championship
2004 Speedway Grand Prix - =24th (13pts)
2005 Speedway Grand Prix - 17th (12pts)
2006 Speedway Grand Prix - =26th (1pt)
2007 Speedway Grand Prix - 19th (10pts)
2008 Speedway Grand Prix - 17th (11pts)
2009 Speedway Grand Prix - 8th (98pts)
2010 Speedway Grand Prix - 7th (106pts) (including winning the Speedway Grand Prix of Sweden)
2011 Speedway Grand Prix - 7th (101pts)
2012 Speedway Grand Prix - 16th (41pts)
2014 Speedway Grand Prix - 13th (79pts)
2017 Speedway Grand Prix - 23rd (7pts)

World team Championships
2004 Speedway World Cup - 3rd
2005 Speedway World Cup - 3rd
2007 Speedway World Cup - 2nd
2008 Speedway World Cup - Winner
2009 Speedway World Cup - 6th
2010 Speedway World Cup - 2nd
2011 Speedway World Cup - 4th
2013 Speedway World Cup - 2nd
2015 Speedway World Cup - 2nd
2016 Speedway World Cup - 5th
2017 Speedway World Cup - 8th
2018 Speedway of Nations - 5th

Speedway Grand Prix

See also 
 Denmark national speedway team
 List of Speedway Grand Prix riders

References 

1984 births
Living people
Danish speedway riders
Speedway World Cup champions
Individual Speedway Junior European Champions
Belle Vue Aces riders
Leicester Lions riders
Newcastle Diamonds riders
Peterborough Panthers riders
People from Esbjerg
Sportspeople from the Region of Southern Denmark